Pillory (foaled 1919 in Kentucky) was an American Thoroughbred racehorse.

Background
Pillory was a chestnut horse bred and raced by the co-owner and president of Saratoga Race Course, Richard Thornton Wilson Jr. Pillory was sired by Wilson's Olambala, a multiple winner of important races including the Latonia Derby and Suburban Handicap, and who sired several top runners including the 1916 American Champion Two-Year-Old Colt Campfire, and top handicap winner Sunfire. Pillory's damsire was Disguise, who raced for James R. Keene in England and was a son of Domino.

Racing career
At age three in 1922, Pillory ran second to J. S. Cosden's French import Snob II. Thoroughbred racing in 1922 was still a time when the U.S. Triple Crown series had not yet achieved the level of importance it would in the next decade. As such, despite being very important races, the Kentucky Derby and the Preakness Stakes were both run on May 13, 1922. The handlers of New York-based Pillory chose not to send the colt on the long railroad trip to Louisville for the Derby. Instead, they entered the colt in the then  Preakness Stakes at Pimlico Race Course in Baltimore, Maryland. In the Preakness, Pillory took the lead on the turn into the stretch and prevailed by a head from Hea after what the press described as a "furious" drive to the finish. Pillory's time of 1:51.60 equaled the winning time of Man o' War two years earlier.

Stud record
Pillory was not successful at stud. He was eventually sold to the U.S. Army as a remount stallion.

Pedigree

References

1919 racehorse births
racehorses bred in Kentucky
racehorses trained in the United States
thoroughbred family 13